Beau Burchell (born December 17, 1978) is an American musician, record producer, and audio engineer from Orange County, California. As a performer, he is best known as the guitarist and backing vocalist in Saosin. He is one of Saosin's founders, and the band's only remaining member who has played with the band through its entire existence. He has previously been a member of Kosmos Express and Open Hand. 

Burchell also has a prolific reputation as a record producer. He has been credited on over thirty albums of various types of punk rock. He also owns the record label Death Do Us Part.

Gear

On stage, Burchell has been seen playing a Gibson Les Paul Custom, a Gibson SG Standard, a Burny Les Paul Custom, a Fender Jaguar, and a Balaguer Guitars Thicket BB. He plays a Hughes & Kettner Triamp MKII amp through both a Hughes & Kettner 4x12 cabinet with Vintage 30 speakers and a 2x12 cabinet with Greenback speakers. He has also stated that onstage he uses a Bob Bradshaw Custom Audio Electronics Looper, a RS-10 MIDI Switching Module, a Line 6 Echo Pro Delay Unit, TC Electronic G-Major, Shure U4D wireless Unit, a Boss noise gate, and a Dunlop Tremolo Pedal.

To record Translating the Name, Burchell played both a Gibson Les Paul Standard and Gibson SG Standard. He used a modded Mesa/Boogie 2-Channel Dual Rectifier amp through a Marshall 1960B cabinet for the rhythm tracks.

Discography

With Kosmos Express

 Now (1997)
 Simulcast (1998)

With As Hope Dies

 Birth Place and Burial Site (2002)
 Legions Bow To A Faceless God (2003)

With Saosin

 Translating the Name (2003)
 Saosin (2006)
 Come Close (2008)
 The Grey EP (2008)
 In Search of Solid Ground (2009)
 Along the Shadow (2016)

Production Credits

External links
 Saosin Official Website

References

Record producers from California
Living people
American punk rock guitarists
1978 births
Musicians from Orange County, California
Guitarists from California
American male guitarists
21st-century American guitarists
21st-century American male musicians
Saosin members
Open Hand members